Fat Family is a Brazilian vocal band from Sorocaba. As the name suggests, all members are overweight people and are members of the same family. They have so far released three albums by EMI Music.

Sidney Cipriano (aka Sidney Sinay) died on February 1, 2011, in São Paulo, from a heart attack at the age of 46. Deise Cipriano died of liver cancer on 12 February 2019, at the age of 39.

Discography
Fat Family - 1998
Fat Festa - 1999
Pra Onde For, Me Leve - 2001
Fat Family - 2003

Tours
 The Fat Family Tour (1998-1999)
 Turnê Fat Festa (1999-2001)
 Por Onde For a Turnê (2001-2003)
 The Fat Family Tour: II You (2003-2005)*

References

Musical groups established in 1998
1998 establishments in Brazil
Family musical groups
Brazilian soul musical groups
Contemporary R&B musical groups
Brazilian vocal groups
Brazilian gospel musical groups